= Texas senators =

Texas senators may refer to:

- Members of the United States Senate representing the State of Texas
- Any member of the Texas Senate
